The Freedom and Reform Party (ÖRP) was a liberal political party in the Turkish Republic of Northern Cyprus.

The party was formed in 2006 by four former MP's from the National Unity Party (UBP) and the Democratic Party (DP). This party served as the junior coalition partner in the former de facto TRNC Government consisting of itself and the Republican Turkish Party led by Mehmet Ali Talat.

Party Leader Turgay Avcı served in the TRNC Cabinet as Deputy Prime Minister and Minister of Foreign Affairs.

References

External links
Official website

Liberal parties in Northern Cyprus
Political parties established in 2006